The 2015–16 Football League One (referred to as the Sky Bet League One for sponsorship reasons) was the 12th season of the Football League One under its current title and the 23rd season under its current league division format. The season began on 8 August 2015, and concluded on 8 May 2016.

Changes from last season

Team changes
The following teams have changed division since the 2014–15 season.

To League One
Promoted from League Two
 Burton Albion
 Shrewsbury Town
 Bury
 Southend United

Relegated from Championship
 Millwall
 Wigan Athletic 
 Blackpool

From League One
Relegated to League Two
 Notts County
 Crawley Town
 Leyton Orient
 Yeovil Town

Promoted to Championship
 Bristol City
 Milton Keynes Dons
 Preston North End

Team overview

Stadia and locations

Managerial changes

League table

Play-offs

Results

Top scorers

Monthly awards

References 

 
EFL League One seasons
1
3
Eng